The Medical Service Cross, post-nominal letters CC (Crux  Curationis), is a military decoration which was instituted by the Republic of South Africa in 1987. It was awarded to members of the South African Medical Service for bravery. The Medical Service Cross was discontinued in 2003, but backdated awards can still be made for acts of bravery during this period.

The South African military
The Union Defence Forces (UDF) were established in 1912 and renamed the South African Defence Force (SADF) in 1958. On 27 April 1994, it was integrated with six other independent forces into the South African National Defence Force (SANDF).

Institution
The Medical Service Cross, post-nominal letters CC (Crux  Curationis), was instituted by the State President in 1987.

Award criteria
The cross was initially awarded for exceptional ingenuity, resourcefulness and skill, and extraordinary leadership, dedication, sense of duty and personal example and courage in mortal danger in non-combatant situations. After 1993, the award criteria were altered to exceptional courage, leadership, skill, ingenuity or tenacity in dangerous or critical situations. A Bar, instituted in 1993, could be awarded in recognition of further similar displays of courage in danger.

Order of wear

The position of the Medical Service Cross in the official order of precedence was revised three times after 1975, to accommodate the inclusion or institution of new decorations and medals, first upon the integration into the South African National Defence Force on 27 April 1994, again in April 1996 when decorations and medals were belatedly instituted for the two former non-statutory forces, the Azanian People's Liberation Army and Umkhonto we Sizwe, and finally upon the institution of a new set of awards on 27 April 2003, but it remained unchanged on all three occasions.

  
Official SANDF order of precedence
 Preceded by the Navy Cross (CN) of the Republic of South Africa.
 Succeeded by the Southern Cross Medal (1952) (SM) of the Republic of South Africa.

Official national order of precedence
 Preceded by the Navy Cross (CN) of the Republic of South Africa.
 Succeeded by the Southern Cross Medal (1952) (SM) of the Republic of South Africa.

Description
Obverse
The Medical Service Cross is a pointed cross, struck in silver, to fit in a circle 45 millimetres in diameter, with the South African Medical Service emblem, the Rod of Aesculapius, in the centre on a ruby red roundel, 18 millimetres in diameter.

Reverse
The reverse has the pre-1994 South African Coat of Arms, with the decoration number stamped underneath.

Bar
The Bar was struck in silver and has an emblem depicting a Protea embossed in the centre. The same Bar was used to indicate multiple awards of the Pro Virtute Medal, Army Cross, Air Force Cross, Navy Cross, Medical Service Cross, Southern Cross Medal (1975) and Pro Merito Medal (1975).

Ribbon
The ribbon is 32 millimetres wide and white, with a 12 millimetres wide ruby red centre band.

Discontinuation
Conferment of the decoration was discontinued in respect of services performed on or after 27 April 2003.

References

Military decorations and medals of South Africa
Courage awards
Awards established in 1987
1987 establishments in South Africa